D'Orbigny's tuco-tuco (Ctenomys dorbignyi) is a species of rodent in the family Ctenomyidae, named after French naturalist Alcide d'Orbigny. It is found in northeast Argentina. Its karyotype has 2n = 70, FN = 84–88, which is cytogenetically indistinguishable from some populations of C. pearsoni; the latter taxon may actually represent several species.

References

Mammals of Argentina
Tuco-tucos
Mammals described in 1984